The men's singles tournament of the 2015 BWF World Championships (World Badminton Championships) took place from August 10 to 16, 2015. Chen Long successfully defended his title winning the World Championships for the second time in his career.

Seeds

  Chen Long (champion)
  Jan Ø. Jørgensen (semifinals)
  Srikanth Kidambi (third round)
  Kento Momota (semifinals)
  Lin Dan (quarterfinals)
  Chou Tien-chen (first round)
  Viktor Axelsen (quarterfinals)
  Wang Zhengming (third round)

  Son Wan-ho (third round)
  Kashyap Parupalli (second round)
  H. S. Prannoy (third round)
  Marc Zwiebler (second round)
  Hu Yun (quarterfinals)
  Hans-Kristian Vittinghus (third round)
  Tommy Sugiarto (second round)
  Rajiv Ouseph (first round)

Draw

Finals

Section 1

Section 2

Section 3

Section 4

References
BWF Website

2015 BWF World Championships